Major-General Sir Theodore Fraser  (15 June 1865 – 22 May 1953), was a British soldier of the Royal Engineers, serving for most of his career with the Indian Army.

Education and early life
Fraser was born on 15 June 1865 in Inverness, Scotland to parents Rev Prof Donald Fraser D.D. (1826–1892) and Theresa Eliza Isabella Gordon, the fourth daughter of Major-General Alexander Gordon of the Royal Engineers. His Scots-born father had spent much time in Canada but returned to Scotland after he married. In 1870 the family moved to Marylebone in London and his father became a prominent figure in the Presbyterian Church of England, serving as Moderator of the Synod in 1880.

From University College School Theodore went to Clare College, Cambridge, obtaining his commission direct into the Royal Engineers in February 1886.

Military career
Indian service soon brought him experience of frontier warfare. He was in the Chin-Lushai expedition of 1889–90 and the Hazara expedition in 1891. He was promoted to captain on 13 August 1896, and served as an adjutant of the 2nd Division during the Tirah campaign of 1897–98. In February 1900 he left Southampton in the SS Assaye bound for active service in South Africa during the Second Boer War. His experience was put to use as a Special Service Officer stationed in Cape Colony, the Orange Free State, and the Frederickstad in Western Transvaal until December that year.

In 1901 he was sent to the Staff College. Promoted to major in September 1904, he was appointed Deputy Assistant Adjutant General (D.A.A.G.) of the Bombay Brigade in February 1905. His role was changed to Deputy Assistant Quartermaster General (D.A.Q.M.G.) at British Army headquarters in Simla in November 1907. He stayed on at the headquarters for two years. 
In February 1909 he assumed the role of a Professor and General Staff Officer Grade 2, instructing young officers at the Command and Staff College in Quetta for the next three years, and was promoted to lieutenant-colonel in December 1912. Shortly after promotion he was sent to the Britannia Royal Naval College.

Though he was eager for active service during World War I, he was given an administrative role of Embarkation Commandant. It was not until March, 1915, that he was appointed Assistant Adjutant (A.A.) and Quartermaster General (Q.M.G.) of the Lahore Division and in France. In this capacity, and later as Assistant Quartermaster General (A.Q.M.G.) he was with the division at "Second Ypres" and the battles of Aubers Ridge and Festubert.

In May, 1916, Colonel Fraser was appointed the administrative role of General Staff Officer Grade 1(G.S.O.1) of the newly formed 15th (Indian) Division, stationing on the Euphrates front until October of that same year where he was again transferred to the III Corps as Brigadier-General General Staff. He led the Corps through the Battle of Kut, and the maneuver leading to the occupation of Baghdad, and then the operations on the Adhaim in April, 1917. He had received a brevet in March, and reached the substantive rank of colonel in December, by which time the operations in the Jabal Hamrin area had been concluded. From February to April, 1918, he acted as Chief of the General Staff to General William Marshall, the Commander-in-Chief of the Mesopotamian campaign.

He assumed the command of the 15th Division in September 1918, the 18th Division in the following March, and promoting to Major-General in June 1919. While assigned to the 18th Division, Fraser was tasked to lead "South Kurdistan Force" to conduct operations against Shaikh Mahmud Barzanji, who was leading a localized rebellion. Barzenji was wounded and ultimately captured by Fraser's forces.  He later was engaged in other Kurdistan operations of 1919–20, relinquishing command in October, 1921, From March to November, 1922, he commanded the forces in Iraq, but was not again employed until May 1924, when he was appointed General Officer Commanding (GOC) Malaya Command. He performed his tour of duty in Singapore for the next three years until his retirement on 9 June 1927, with Major-General C.C. Van Straubenzee, KBE, CB, CMG (1867–1956) replacing him as the next GOC Malaya on 16 June 1927.

Major-General Sir Theodore Fraser's last known home address was at The Rookery, Roehampton Lane, London in  1939.

Sir Theodore Fraser died in a nursing home on 22 May 1953 in Putney, London, at the age of 87. His funeral was carried at out the Putney Vale Crematorium at 2.30 p.m. on Tuesday, 26 May 1953.

Family

He married Constance Ruth Stevenson, daughter of Nathaniel Stevenson in June 1903 at Marylebone Parish Church.

References

 Obituary in the Daily Telegraph, 23 May 1953.
 The Times Newspaper, 13 May 1939.

 

1865 births
1953 deaths
Royal Engineers officers
British Army personnel of the Second Boer War
Knights Commander of the Order of the Bath
Companions of the Order of the Star of India
Companions of the Order of St Michael and St George
Military of Singapore under British rule
Military personnel from Inverness
British military personnel of the Tirah campaign
Alumni of Clare College, Cambridge
People educated at University College School
British Army generals of World War I
British Army major generals
Scottish military personnel